Ardmore is an unincorporated community and census-designated place (CDP) in Fall River County, South Dakota, United States. The town was founded in 1889 by European-American settlers. The population was 1 at the 2020 census.

Description

The town is believed to have been derived from the name of Dora Moore, a local teacher. It is at an elevation of 3,556 feet.

Ardmore was featured in the May 2004 issue of National Geographic Magazine. It is located next to a stretch of BNSF railroad. Approximately 15-25 abandoned houses have survived at the site. The town sign is still standing.

History
In 1927, President Calvin Coolidge stopped in Ardmore.

The town survived the Great Depression without one family on welfare. The decline of agriculture and move of young people to other areas for work reduced the population. The last time the town had a recorded population was in 1980, when the 1980 census showed a population of 16 residents.

Ardmore celebrated a reunion on September 4, 2010, at the Ardmore Volunteer Fire Department.

Notable person
 Doc Middleton, a former resident and infamous outlaw

References

External links

Populated places in Fall River County, South Dakota
Unincorporated communities in South Dakota
Populated places established in 1889
1889 establishments in Dakota Territory